, nicknamed Fujigas, is a retired Japanese motorcycle trials rider. Fujinami competed in motorcycle trial riding from a young age and became a FIM world champion in 2004. Fujinami retired from trial riding after the 2021 TrialGP season to take up the role of team manager of the Repsol Honda Trial Team; his seat will be taken by Gabriel Marcelli who will ride for the team from 2022 onward.

Major titles 
1995
1st All Japan Trial Championship
1998
1st All Japan Trial Championship
1999
1st All Japan Trial Championship (Grand Slam)
2nd World Trial Championship
2000
2nd World Trial Championship
1st All Japan Trial Championship
2001
2nd World Trial Championship
1st All Japan Trial Championship
2002
2nd World Trial Championship
2003
2nd World Trial Championship
2004
World Trial Champion
2nd World Indoor Trial Championship
2005
2nd World Trial Championship
2006
2nd World Trial Championship

World Trials Championship Career

References

External links

fujigas.net

1980 births
People from Yokkaichi
Sportspeople from Mie Prefecture
Japanese motorcycle racers
Motorcycle trials riders
Living people
21st-century Japanese people